"I Ain't Havin' That" is a song written and performed by American hip hop duo Heltah Skeltah featuring fellow rappers Starang Wondah and Doc Holiday. It was released on August 3, 1998 via Duck Down/Priority Records as the lead single from the duo's second studio album Magnum Force. Recording sessions took place at D&D Studios in New York City. Production was handled by Cuzin Bawb and Starang Wondah. The song sampled A Tribe Called Quest's "Hot Sex" and Redman's "Pick It Up".

The single peaked at number 80 on the US Billboard Hot 100 and at number 58 on the Hot R&B/Hip-Hop Songs chart.

Track listing

Personnel

"I Ain't Havin' That"
Jahmal Bush – main artist, vocals
Sean Price – main artist, vocals
Jack McNair – featured artist, vocals, producer
Ronnie Duren – featured artist, vocals
Ed Miller – engineering

"Worldwide"
Jahmal Bush – main artist, vocals
Sean Price – main artist, vocals
Edward Hinson – producer
Ed Miller – engineering

Charts

References

External links

1998 songs
1998 singles
Hardcore hip hop songs
East Coast hip hop songs
Priority Records singles